Babak Jabbari (born October 10, 1994 in Iran) is an Iranian football forward who played for Esteghlal.

References

External links
 Babak Jabbari at PersianLeague

Iranian footballers
1994 births
Living people
Esteghlal F.C. players
Association football forwards
Association football midfielders